The 1999 World Archery Championships was the 40th edition of the event. It was held in Riom, France on 22–29 July 1999 and was organized by World Archery Federation (FITA).

Medals table

Medals summary

Recurve

Compound

References

External links
 World Archery website
 Complete results

World Championship
1999 in French sport
1999
World Championships,1999
Archery, World Championships